Aura most commonly refers to:
 Aura (paranormal), a field of luminous multicolored radiation around a person or object
 Aura (symptom), a symptom experienced before a migraine or seizure
 Halo (religious iconography), glory, or aureola, a ring of light that surrounds a person in religious art
 Halo (optical phenomenon), glory (optical phenomenon) or corona (optical phenomenon), phenomena where a ring of light surrounds an object

Aura may also refer to:

Places

Extraterrestrial
 1488 Aura, a main-belt asteroid

Terrestrial
 Aura (woreda), administrative division in Ethiopia
 Aura, Finland, a municipality in Finland
 Aura, Michigan, a community in the United States
 Aura, New Jersey, a community in the United States
 Aura an der Saale, a municipality in Bavaria, Germany
 Aura Erbil, a mixed use city center in Iraqi Kurdistan
 Aura im Sinngrund, a community in Bavaria, Germany

Rivers 
 Aura River (Finland), a river in southwestern Finland
 Aura (Norway), a river in Nesset Municipality, Norway
 Aura (Sinn), a river in Bavaria, Germany
 Aurá River, a river in Maranhão state, Brazil

Structures
 Aura (Toronto), a high-rise condominium building in Toronto, Ontario, Canada
 Aura Abbey, Benedictine monastery at Aura an der Saale, Bavaria, Germany

People
 Aura (Danish singer), Danish singer Aura Dione (born 1988) 
 Aura (South African singer), South African singer Aura Lewis (1947–2015)
 Aura K. Dunn, American politician
 Aura Kiiskinen (1878—1968), Finnish politician
 Aura Mayari, American drag queen
 Aura Twarowska, Romanian operatic mezzo-soprano Aura Twarowska (born 1967)
 Au/Ra, Spanish pop singer Jamie Lou Stenzel (born 2002)

Arts, entertainment, and media

Fictional characters
 Aura (.hack), a character in the .hack franchise
 Aura (mythology), Greek goddess whose name means breeze
 Aura (Seiken Densetsu), an elemental spirit in the Seiken Densetsu series
 Aura the Finnish Maiden, personification of Finland
 Princess Aura, a character from Flash Gordon
 Aura, a character in Tiny Furniture

Literature
 Aura (novel), by Carlos Fuentes
 Aura: Maryūinkōga Saigo no Tatakai, a novel, adapted as a manga and anime film

Music

Albums
 Aura (Asia album), a 2001 album by Asia
 Aura (Yvonne Catterfeld album), a 2006 album by Yvonne Catterfeld
 Aura (CMX album), a 1994 album by CMX
 Aura (Miles Davis album), a 1989 album by Miles Davis
 Aura (Ozuna album), a 2018 album by Ozuna
 Aura (The Alpha Conspiracy album), a 2004 album by The Alpha Conspiracy
 Aura (The Brave album), a 2019 album by The Brave
 Aura (The Mission album), a 2001 album by The Mission

Songs 
 "Aura" (song), by Lady Gaga
 "Aura", by Bruno Maderna
 "Aura", by Ozuna
 "Aura", by Dennis Lloyd

Other uses in music
 Aura (band), rock band
 Aura (Magnus Lindberg), a 1994 orchestral composition

Other uses in arts, entertainment, and media
 Aura: Fate of the Ages, a 2004 computer game
 The Aura (film), a 2005 Argentine thriller film

Brands and enterprises
 Aura (cell phone), manufactured by Motorola
 Aura, a brand name of Bowers & Wilkins
 Saturn Aura, a midsize sedan manufactured by Saturn Corporation from 2007 to 2010
 Hyundai Aura, a subcompact sedan manufactured by Hyundai Motor Company since 2019

Science and technology
 Aura (satellite), in the NASA Earth Observing System series

 Aura Graphics Architecture, which handles input events and windows in ChromeOS
 Autonomous robot architecture, a hybrid deliberative/reactive robot architecture

Other uses
 Aura (musical instrument), invented by Johann Scheibler in 1816

 Aura cheese, a Finnish blue mold cheese
 Aurá language, an extinct language from Brazil

See also 
 AURA (disambiguation)
 Aurra, a 1980s soul group